Events from the year 2006 in Russia.

Incumbents
President: Vladimir Putin
Prime Minister: Mikhail Fradkov

Events
January 2–5 - Gimry fighting
February 20 – Sukhoi, Tupolev, Ilyushin, Yakovlev, Irkut, Mikoyan, six aircraft brand merged, United Aircraft Corporation has business start. 
July 4 - 2006 Avtury ambush
September 11 - 2006 Vladikavkaz Mi-8 crash
September 13 - Ingush–Chechen fratricide incident
September 15 - Minister of Health Mikhail Zurabov and Deputy Chairman of the State Duma Committee for Health Protection Nikolai Gerasimenko propose reinstating the Childless tax in Russia that it used to have until the 1990s, Due to declining birth rates.
December 2 - The Tolmachevy Twins won the Junior Eurovision Song Contest 2006 in Bucharest, Romania

Births

Daria Usacheva

Deaths

January

January 31 - Boris Kostelanetz, 94, Russian-born American tax lawyer.

June

June 2 - Vyacheslav Klykov, 66, Russian sculptor and nationalist politician.
June 17 - 
 Mikhail Lapshin, 71, Russian politician, leader of the Agrarian Party and former president of the Altai Republic (2002–2006), cause unknown.
 Abdul-Halim Sadulayev, 40, fourth President of the Chechen Republic of Ichkeria.

July

July 7 - Dina Kaminskaya, 87, Russian lawyer who defended Soviet dissidents.
July 10 - Shamil Basayev, 41, senior leader of the Chechen  independence movement and Islamist militant..

See also
List of Russian films of 2006

References

External links

 
Years of the 21st century in Russia
2000s in Russia